Ford Cup may refer to:

 Ford Cup (tennis)
 Ford Cup – Defensive, renamed the Telus Cup – Defensive
 Ford Cup – Offensive, renamed the Telus Cup – Offensive